Sredoje Lukić (born 5 April 1961, Rujiste, Višegrad, Bosnia and Herzegovina) is a Bosnian Serb war criminal. 

Before and during the Bosnian war, Lukić worked as a policeman in Visegrad. After the war started, he joined his cousin Milan Lukić's group of paramilitaries known as the White Eagles (Beli Orlovi). In July 2009 after being tried with his cousin he was found guilty by the International Criminal Tribunal for the former Yugoslavia (ICTY) of crimes against humanity and violations of war customs committed in the Višegrad municipality of Bosnia and Herzegovina during the Bosnian war.  

He was found to have substantially contributed to the deaths of 59 people trapped in the Pionirska Street fire.  He had been present at Jusuf Memić's house, and carrying arms, while the robbery and the strip searches were taking place inside and when the women were removed.  He was also present during the transfer of victims to Adem Omeragić's house. The ICTY Trial Chamber concluded that there was no reliable evidence he had set the house on fire or shot at the windows as people tried to escape. Nevertheless, although he did not set Adem Omeragić's house on fire himself, he knew what would happen to the group of victims that he helped to herd there. Judge Patrick Robinson dissenting, the Trial Chamber found that by his presence and by being armed, Sredoje Lukić substantially contributed to the deaths of the 59 people trapped in the house and that he had aided and abetted the cruel treatment and inhumane acts committed against all the members of the group.

In relation to the Uzamnica camp, the evidence showed that Milan Lukić and Sredoje Lukić were opportunistic visitors to the camp, which Sredoje visited less frequently than Milan. They both severely and repeatedly kicked and beat detainees with fists, truncheons, sticks and rifle butts. As opportunistic visitors to the camp, they came for no other reason than to inflict violence on the detainees. The extraordinary brutality with which they behaved towards the detainees caused them serious and permanent damage. The ICTY's Trial Chamber observed that the Pionirska street fire was an example of the worst acts of inhumanity that a person was capable of inflicting upon others and "ranked high in the long, sad and wretched history of man's inhumanity to man".

Sredoje Lukić's defence team filed a notice of appeal and its appeal brief. The prosecution has also filed a motion of appeal and its appeal briefs, requesting that Lukić's sentence be reviewed and lengthened.

References

1961 births
People from Višegrad
People convicted by the International Criminal Tribunal for the former Yugoslavia
Living people
Serbs of Bosnia and Herzegovina convicted of crimes against humanity